The Eurovision Song Contest 1964 was the 9th edition of the annual Eurovision Song Contest. Organised by the European Broadcasting Union (EBU) and host broadcaster Danmarks Radio (DR), the contest was held at Tivolis Koncertsal on 21 March 1964, and was hosted by Danish TV presenter Lotte Wæver.

Sixteen countries participated in the contest.  made its debut this year, while  decided not to enter.

At the age of 16 years and 92 days, Gigliola Cinquetti became the youngest winner of the contest yet; a record she held until . The entry had one of the widest margins of victory ever witnessed in the competition. It garnered almost three times as many points as the second-placed song.

Location 

The host venue for the contest was Tivolis Koncertsal (Tivoli Concert Hall) in Denmark's capital city Copenhagen, which lies within Denmark's famous amusement park and pleasure garden Tivoli Gardens. The park, alluding by its name to the Jardin de Tivoli that existed in Paris, was opened on 15 August 1843, and is the second oldest amusement park in the world, after Dyrehavsbakken in nearby Klampenborg.

Format 
Each country had 10 jury members who distributed three points among their one, two, or three favourite songs. The points were totaled and the first, second, and third placed songs were awarded 5, 3, and 1 votes in order. If only one song got every point within the jury it would get all 9 points. If only two songs were chosen, the songs would get 6 and 3 points in order.

The contest this year was highly politicised with demands that right-wing dictatorships in Spain and Portugal should be excluded from the contest. This controversy became apparent during the contest as just before the Belgian entry, a man entered the stage holding a banner saying "Boycott Franco and Salazar". He was quickly removed from the stage. This alarmed the audience, to where the camera footage cut to the scoreboard, however, photographs were taken and released after the event. This would be the very first stage invasion in the contest's history.

The immediate response of the Koncertsal audience to the Italian entry was markedly enthusiastic and prolonged and, most unusually for a contest performance, after leaving the stage Gigliola Cinquetti was allowed to return to take a second bow. Her performance was given an unscheduled repeat on British television the following afternoon.  In the event, she won the most crushing victory in the history of the contest, with a score almost three times that of her nearest rival, a feat extremely unlikely ever to be beaten under the post-1974 scoring system.

Lost recordings 
Some clips of the contest have survived, including part of the opening ceremonies, including some of presenter Lotte Wæver's welcoming remarks, as well as the majority of the repeat performance of "Non ho l'età" from the end of the broadcast. For some time, there was a rumour that a copy of the entire contest existed in the French television archives. In 2021, INA confirmed to Wiwibloggs that the French television archives do not possess a copy of the contest. 

A persistent myth, even repeated on the official Eurovision site, is that the tape was destroyed in a fire in the 1970s. More recent interviews with DR, however, state that the broadcast was never recorded in the first place, allegedly due to no tape machines being available at the studio at the time. The audio of the entire show, however, is still available online, and some short video clips and photos remain available.

Participating countries 

 did not participate this year due to a strike among members of the Swedish Union for Performing Arts and Film. Swedish broadcaster Sveriges Radio however did ultimately broadcast the event.  competed in the contest for the first time, however they became the first country to score nul points on their début entry. Germany, Switzerland, and Yugoslavia also scored nul points for the first time. The Netherlands became the first country to send a singer of non-European ancestry, Anneke Grönloh who was of Indonesian descent. Spain decided to send the Italian-Uruguayan group Los TNT who were the first group of three or more participants in the history of the contest.

Returning artists

Conductors 
Each performance had a conductor who conducted the orchestra.

 Jacques Denjean
 Dolf van der Linden
 Karsten Andersen
 Kai Mortensen
 George de Godzinsky
 Johannes Fehring
 Franck Pourcel
 Harry Rabinowitz
 Willy Berking
 Michel Colombier
 Kai Mortensen
 
 Radivoje Spasić
 Fernando Paggi
 Henri Segers

Participants and results

Detailed voting results

5 points 
Below is a summary of all 5 points in the final:

Spokespersons 

Listed below is the order in which votes were cast during the 1964 contest along with the spokesperson who was responsible for announcing the votes for their respective country.

 TBC
 Pim Jacobs
 
 
 
 
 
 Kenneth Kendall
 
 TBC
 Maria Manuela Furtado
 Rosanna Vaudetti
 Saša Novak
 
 André Hagon
 Eduardo Sancho

Broadcasts 

Each participating broadcaster was required to relay the contest via its networks. Non-participating EBU member broadcasters were also able to relay the contest as "passive participants". Broadcasters were able to send commentators to provide coverage of the contest in their own native language and to relay information about the artists and songs to their television viewers.

Known details on the broadcasts in each country, including the specific broadcasting stations and commentators are shown in the tables below.

Incidents

Stage invasion
A political protest occurred after the Swiss entry: a man trespassed onto the stage holding a banner that read "Boycott Franco & Salazar". Whilst this was going on, television viewers were shown a shot of the scoreboard; once the man was removed the contest went on.

Notes

References

External links

 
1964
Music festivals in Denmark
1964 in music
1964 in Denmark
March 1964 events in Europe
Events in Copenhagen
1960s in Copenhagen
Lost television shows